Henry Morgan (died 1632) was a Welsh politician who sat in the House of Commons  in 1601.

Morgan was the eldest son of Henry Morgan of Llandaff and Penllwyn-Sarth. In 1601, he was elected Member of Parliament for Monmouthshire. He was High Sheriff of Monmouthshire in 1603.

Morgan married  Cicely Welsh, daughter of Arnold Welsh of Llanwern.

References

Year of birth missing
1632 deaths
English MPs 1601
High Sheriffs of Monmouthshire
People from Llandaff